Captain January is a 1924 American silent drama film directed by Edward F. Cline and featuring child star Baby Peggy. It was the first screen adaptation of the 1891 children's book Captain January by Laura E. Richards. The other adaptation of the novel was the film Captain January (1936) with Shirley Temple.

Plot

Captain January (Baby Peggy) is a young girl who lives in a lighthouse in Maine with her guardian, Jeremiah "Daddy" Judkins (Hobart Bosworth). Judkins, who is the lighthouse keeper, rescued January from a shipwreck when she was an infant. The only clue to the baby's identity was a locket with a photograph of a woman around her neck, so Judkins adopted her as his own daughter.

January helps Judkins with his tasks around the lighthouse. As Judkins' heart begins to fail and his health worsens, these tasks become increasingly more complicated and important. In one instance, January must ascend to the top of the lighthouse by herself to light the lamps. The local townsfolk become skeptical of Judkins' ability to care for the girl, and try to have her taken away.

January is saved from the orphanage by a chance meeting with Isabelle Morton (Irene Rich), an affluent young woman who comes to visit the lighthouse. She believes that January looks familiar; when she sees the photograph in the locket, she identifies January as her late sister's child.

Isabelle wishes to adopt January and reunite her with her blood relatives. Faced with his poor health and the scrutiny of the townspeople, Judkins agrees. However, the girl is miserable in her new surroundings, runs away, and finds her way back to the lighthouse. Judkins and the Morton family finally devise a means to make everyone happy: January returns to the Mortons, and Judkins is employed on the family's yacht, ensuring that he will always be able to visit his former daughter.

Cast

Reception
The film was released to mostly positive reception, with a reviewer from Motion Picture Classic stating "Under appreciative direction, [she behaves] like any normal active six-year old kid... She is natural -- not a bit precocious -- and acts with a sincerity that should be adopted by many of her adult contemporaries."

Preservation
Captain January is one of only six of Baby Peggy's full-length feature films to survive to the current era. It has been preserved in several film archives around the world, including the Library of Congress in the United States. The film has also been restored and made available to the public by independent silent film dealers.

See also
 Captain January - the 1936 Shirley Temple version of the novel

References

External links

 
 
 
 
 Silent Film Review: Captain January at moviessilently.com
 

1924 films
1924 drama films
American silent feature films
Films about orphans
Films based on children's books
Films directed by Edward F. Cline
Silent American drama films
American black-and-white films
Films produced by Sol Lesser
Films with screenplays by John Grey
Works set in lighthouses
1920s American films